The Marshall JTM45 is the first guitar amplifier made by Marshall. First produced in 1963, it has been called a "seminal" amplifier, and is praised as being among the most desirable of all the company's amplifiers.

History

Prototyping of the JTM45 begin in 1962, after London musical instrument retailer Jim Marshall decided to create a new amplifier in response to local guitarists' desire for an alternative to Fender amps.  Marshall first enlisted his shop repairman Ken Bran, who then recommended electronics "whiz kid" Dudley Craven as the chief circuit designer.  Marshall had Pete Townshend and Ritchie Blackmore demo prototypes built by Bran and Craven, settling on the sixth prototype as the production model.  Dubbed the "JTM45" - for Jim and his son Terry Marshall, and 45 for the RMS-rated wattage - the amp mimicked the circuitry of the Fender Bassman but used an all-aluminum chassis, a 12AX7 valve as the first in the chain (the Bassman has a 12AY7), Celestion speakers with a closed cabinet (compared to open-backed Jensen speakers), and a modified negative feedback circuit, which affects the harmonics produced by the amplifier. As Bran later said, "The JTM also had different harmonic content, and this was due to the large amount of feedback that Dudley Craven had given it."  Early versions used 6L6 or US 5881 valves (a version of the 6L6) in the output stage; later models used KT66 (from 1964), EL34 (from 1966), or KT88 (from 1967; in the 200W Major), and ECC83 (12AX7) valves in the pre-amplification stage. The amp was also available as a bass (which lacked a "bright" capacitor) and a PA version (which lacked a "mixer" capacitor).  Because of its power, Marshall decided early on to build it as a "head," with a separate 4×12" cabinet with Celestion speakers.

Its first ever use in a live performance was in September 1963 when the first amp was tested at the  Ealing Club, not far from the original Marshall shops. By the mid 1960s, the JTM45 had become so popular that it began to supplant the ubiquitous Vox amps, even their AC50, though it was just as powerful.

In late 1965, Marshall introduced its now standard script lettering, in white, and by early 1966 it began calling the amplifiers "JTM 50". Some 100 early models had red lettering; these are especially collectible. Other cosmetic changes included a gradual change to different knobs. The JTM 45 became the basis for many subsequent Marshalls, most notably the Marshall 1962 combo (later referred to as the "Bluesbreaker" due to its use by Eric Clapton with John Mayall's Bluesbreakers). It ceased being produced in 1966, but was reissued in 1989, though with a modern printed circuit board and 6L6 output valves. In 2014 Marshall reissued a "handwired" 30 W amplifier based on the JTM45, the 2245THW, whose circuitry is identical to the 1962 combo circuit; it is a "fine high-end piece" according to Vintage Guitar, listed at $4,800.

Name, numbering
The first JTM45s did not have the standard Marshall number that later amps had; models that derived from the JTM 45 did not receive numbers until 1964-5 when backplates were applied. However at random some of the early amps had serial numbers stamped into the chassis in back.

Sound
For all of its differences when compared with the Bassman, the sound of the JTM45 is still described as "like a tweed Fender", and is favoured for blues and rock rather than for hard rock and metal. The JTM 45 delivers a smooth Marshall sound with a warm bass response due to the EL34/KT66 valves.

Notable users
Arthur Brown
John Entwistle
David Gilmour
Eddy Grant
Peter Green
Jimi Hendrix
Gary Moore (reissue)
Pete Townshend
Angus Young (live, Young has a JTM45 in an isolation box under the stage)
The Rolling Stones

References

External links

Marshall 1987X Plexi Review (Russian)

Instrument amplifiers
Marshall amplifiers
Valve amplifiers